Broadway–Paterson was a New York, Susquehanna and Western Railroad (NYS&W) station in Paterson, New Jersey near the level, or at-grade crossing south of Broadway at Ellison Place and Madison Avenue. Service by the New Jersey Midland, a predecessor to the NYS&W, had begun in 1873. It was originally known as Paterson, but was renamed after a junction of the railroad's mainline was created to build the Paterson City Branch. The station house, demolished in 1982, was situated between the two lines and served as the Susquehanna's headquarters for several years. Passenger service on the branch ended in 1960 and on the mainline in 1966.

Paterson City Branch 
Begun in the 1881 as the Paterson Extension Railroad, the Paterson City Branch was a spur which diverged from what was then New Jersey Midland Railroad, and now the NWS&W main at line MP 20, at Madison Avenue and Ellison Place. Passenger service was curtailed in 1926 from seven trains to one and stopped completely on January 1, 1927, after which the line was used only for freight. 

Soon after the opening of the Susquehanna Transfer, the line was refurbished and passenger service was revived. The NYSW received spent $14,000 (1940 USD) to reconstruct the roadbed and $9,000 to build a new station to replace the old depot. Paterson City station re-opened on July 15, 1940, and was expanded twice by 1941. Service was eventually was discontinued on January 9, 1960. The city bought the double track width right of way (ROW) (between Pearl and 16th streets) in 1960; there are few remnants.

Proposed Madison Avenue station 
The Passaic–Bergen–Hudson Transit Project is a project by NJ Transit to possibly reintroduce passenger service on a portion of the NYSW right-of-way (ROW) in Passaic, Bergen and Hudson counties using newly built, FRA-compliant diesel multiple unit rail cars. A Madison Avenue station stop would be located southwest of the grade crossing between the intersections of Broadway with Madison Avenue and East 18th Street. It is one of several proposed for Paterson. Plans call for service to run from Hawthorne south through Paterson, east to Hackensack and then southeast to North Bergen, where it would join the Hudson-Bergen Light Rail (HBLR).

See also 
 Tram-train
 NYSW (passenger 1939–1966) map
 Passaic-Bergen-Hudson Transit map

References

Bibliography 

Railway stations in the United States opened in 1872
Railway stations closed in 1966
Transportation in Paterson, New Jersey
Former New York, Susquehanna and Western Railway stations
Former railway stations in New Jersey
Railway stations in Passaic County, New Jersey
Proposed NJ Transit rail stations
1872 establishments in New Jersey
1966 disestablishments in New Jersey